What the Butler Saw is a 1950 British comedy film directed by Godfrey Grayson and starring Edward Rigby, Henry Mollison and Mercy Haystead. It was made by Hammer Films.

Cast
 Edward Rigby - The Earl
 Henry Mollison - Bembridge
 Mercy Haystead - Lapis
 Michael Ward - Gerald
 Eleanor Hallam - Lady Mary
 Peter Burton - Bill Fenton
 Anne Valery -Elaine
 Harold Charlton - Perks
 Alfred Harris - Bishop
 George Bishop - The General
 Norman Pitt - Policeman

References

Bibliography
 Heffernan, Kevin. Ghouls, gimmicks, and gold: horror films and the American movie business, 1953-1968. Duke University Press, 2004.

External links

What the Butler Saw at Hammer Films

1950 films
British comedy films
1950 comedy films
Hammer Film Productions films
Films directed by Godfrey Grayson
British black-and-white films
1950s English-language films
1950s British films